Nikola Stanjević Gospel is an illuminated manuscript Gospel Book in Old Serbian (Rascian). It was donated to the Hilandar monastery of Mount Athos by Serbian Imperial Military commander Nikola Stanjević of Northern Macedonia. The decorations of the manuscript shows a diversity of styles which makes this manuscript special. Its author is a monk by the name of Feoktist.

References

Nikola Stanjevic Gospel. Complete Aprakos. Mid-14th cent. Serbian version. Scribe: Monk Feoktist. Fragment

Medieval documents of Serbia
Serbian manuscripts
Gospel Books
14th-century biblical manuscripts
14th-century illuminated manuscripts
Cyrillic manuscripts